
Gmina Niemodlin is an urban-rural gmina (administrative district) in Opole County, Opole Voivodeship, in south-western Poland.

Villages
Apart from the town of Niemodlin, Gmina Niemodlin contains the villages and settlements of Brzęczkowice, Góra, Gościejowice, Grabin, Gracze, Grodziec, Jaczowice, Jakubowice, Krasna Góra, Lipno, Magnuszowice, Magnuszowiczki, Mała Góra, Michałówek, Molestowice, Piotrowa, Radoszowice, Rogi, Roszkowice, Rutki, Rzędziwojowice, Sady, Sarny Wielkie, Sosnówka, Szydłowiec Śląski, Tarnica, Tłustoręby and Wydrowice.

Neighbouring gminas
Gmina Niemodlin is bordered by the gminas of Dąbrowa, Grodków, Łambinowice, Lewin Brzeski, Olszanka, Skoroszyce and Tułowice.

Twin towns – sister cities

Gmina Niemodlin is twinned with:
 Dolyna, Ukraine
 Pražmo, Czech Republic
 Štíty, Czech Republic
 Vechelde, Germany

References

Niemodlin
Opole County